The tram route 24 in Brussels, Belgium was a tram route operated by the STIB/MIVB, which connected the Schaerbeek railway station to the Vanderkindere stop in the municipality of Uccle. The route ran only on weekdays until 8:00 pm. 

Starting from the Schaerbeek railway station the route ran on the Avenue Princess Elisabeth/Prinses Elisabethlaan and then turned left on the greater ring road, where it joined the tram route 23. The route then ran along that road up to the Vanderkindere crossroad. After the Meiser stop where the tram route 25 joined the routes 23 and 24, the route entered a tunnel known as the greater ring axis, which crosses the municipalities of Woluwe-Saint-Lambert, Woluwe-Saint-Pierre at the Montgomery metro station and Etterbeek. The tunnel ends after the Boileau premetro station, then connects with the Belgian rail at the Etterbeek railway station, then crosses the municipalities of Ixelles, City of Brussels and Uccle.

From March 14, 2011, the tram routes 23 and 24 were replaced by tram route 7 which serves the same route as tram 23, as well as tram 24 apart from the "Schaerbeek Gare/Schaarbeek station" stop.

See also
List of Brussels tram routes

References

External links
STIB/MIVB official website

24
City of Brussels
Etterbeek
Ixelles
Schaerbeek
Uccle
Woluwe-Saint-Lambert
Woluwe-Saint-Pierre
Railway services discontinued in 2011